Atelognathus nitoi is a species of frog in the family Batrachylidae found in Chile and Argentina. Its natural habitats are sub-antarctic forests, subtropical or tropical dry shrubland, sub-antarctic grassland, freshwater marshes, and intermittent freshwater marshes.

References

nitoi
Amphibians of Argentina
Amphibians of Chile
Taxonomy articles created by Polbot
Amphibians described in 1973